Puja Chakraborty is a Bangladeshi cricketer who plays as a right-arm off break bowler. In November 2019, she was named in Bangladesh's squad for the cricket tournament at the 2019 South Asian Games.

She made her Women's Twenty20 International (WT20I) debut for Bangladesh, against Maldives, on 5 December 2019. She took one wicket for one run in that match.

References

External links

Living people
Date of birth missing (living people)
Year of birth missing (living people)
Place of birth missing (living people)
Bangladeshi women cricketers
Bangladesh women Twenty20 International cricketers
Barisal Division women cricketers
South Asian Games medalists in cricket
South Asian Games gold medalists for Bangladesh